Be Slowly is the debut studio album by British pop band Jaws.

The album was released on 14 September 2014 through SideOneDummy and Rattlepop as a digital download.

Background 
On 27 May 2014, the band announced their debut album Be Slowly set for release on 15 September. The title song "Be Slowly" was recorded and produced by Oliver Horton AKA Dreamtrak (Swim Deep, Foals, Cymbals) That day they also uploaded the title track to SoundCloud, as well as making the album available for pre-order.

Track listing

References

External links 
 

2014 debut albums
Jaws (band) albums
SideOneDummy Records albums